The Buckinghamshire Way is long-distance walking route along the length of Buckinghamshire; which is to say the traditional county.  It was developed as a walking route in celebration of the county for the Association of British Counties.

Southern trailhead: West of Lammas Park and its London Stone where Staines-upon-Thames meets Hythe End, Wraysbury
Northern trailhead: Northey Farm 

The route is a single route starting close to the southernmost point of the traditional county in Hythe End and finishing at the northern limit of Lavendon.

Sites on or close to the path include the Ankerwycke Meadow, Eton College, Cliveden, the Chequers Estate, Waddesdon Manor, the Quainton Windmill, Milton Keynes and Olney.

The walk is not currently waymarked.  It incorporates sections of a number of waymarked routes, including the Thames Path, the Chiltern Way, the South Bucks Way, the North Bucks Way (extensively) and Aylesbury Outer Ring, the Midshires Way and the Grand Union Canal towpath, along with local paths.

Gallery

References

External links

The Buckinghamshire Way on WildþingUK

Long-distance footpaths in England
Footpaths in Buckinghamshire
County-themed walking routes in the United Kingdom